The , or Ise Bay Ferry is a ferry that runs between the Port of Toba in Toba, Mie Prefecture and the Port of Irago in Tahara, Aichi Prefecture, Japan.  The ferry is operated by the Ise-wan Ferry Corporation.

The ride between Toba and Irago takes 55 minutes and runs eight times per day during most times of the year, and thirteen times per day during busy season.  For an extra fee, passengers can load their cars on the boat.

External links
  Ise-wan Ferry - Official Website

Ferries of Japan
Transport in Mie Prefecture
Transport in Aichi Prefecture